Robert "Robbie" Baldwin is a superhero appearing in American comic books published by Marvel Comics. Created by artist Steve Ditko and writer Tom DeFalco, the character first appeared in The Amazing Spider-Man Annual #22 (January 1988) originally known as Speedball, as well as in Civil War: Front Line #10 (January 2007) as Penance.

The character's origin and early exploits as Speedball were depicted soon after in a solo series. After that series was cancelled, he appeared as a member of the superhero team the New Warriors, in the monthly title of the same name. In the Marvel Comics crossover Civil War, the character changes his name and appearance to Penance. Following this change, he is a member of the Thunderbolts. As of the first issue of Avengers Academy, he has reverted to Speedball and a modified version of his original costume.

Publication history

Created by artist Steve Ditko and writer Tom DeFalco, the character first appeared in The Amazing Spider-Man Annual #22 (January 1988), originally known as Speedball (initially as a candidate for Marvel's separate New Universe imprint).

Marvel Comics published ten issues of the monthly comic book series Speedball from 1988 to 1989. The series was primarily plotted and penciled by Steve Ditko who also supplied the covers. It was scripted by Roger Stern and inked by several different artists.

After the series' cancellation, the Speedball character primarily appeared in New Warriors and its related comics, written primarily by Fabian Nicieza. Speedball continued to be the most consistent character through the second and third volumes of the New Warriors. During his run on New Warriors, Fabian Nicieza commented:

The character is featured in Paul Jenkins's Civil War: Front Line, after it was revealed that he was the only member of the New Warriors to survive the Stamford disaster. The character underwent a drastic change in this series, in which his powers alter and takes the name Penance, joining the Thunderbolts. He would also feature in his own limited series Penance: Relentless, also written by Jenkins, which examines the background to these changes. In the Thunderbolts comics series, Mike Deodato based Baldwin's appearance on actor Edward Norton.

He appears as a supporting character in Avengers Academy #1-20 (Aug 2010-Dec 2011), back in his Speedball persona. After recruiting Sam Alexander in Nova Vol. 5 #7-9, Speedball became part of the 2014 incarnation of the New Warriors.

Fictional character biography
Robbie Baldwin was born in Springdale, Connecticut to mother Madeline, who co-starred in a soap opera with Mary Jane Watson and subsequently became a teacher, and father Justin, a successful district attorney. As a high school student, Robbie gains superpowers after an accident at the Hammond Research Laboratory where he works part-time as a laboratory worker. When Hammond scientists try to tap into a mysterious other-dimensional energy source, the energy bombards Baldwin. Baldwin survives the experience but finds himself surrounded by energy bubbles and clad in an odd costume.

Minutes afterwards, during a battle with some thieves who want to raid the lab, Baldwin discovers that his body now generates a kinetic energy field that protects him from impact and makes him a bouncing dynamo of kinetic energy. Calling himself Speedball, Baldwin becomes a crime-fighter in his hometown of Springdale, Connecticut. Baldwin's parents have marital problems while he secretly leads his double life. This situation leads to domestic stress that escalates over time, driven partly by the conflict between Robbie and his father, who as district attorney is expected to uphold Springdale's ordinance against costumed superheroes and has an extreme prejudice against these "vigilantes".

The energy source also affects Niels, a cat belonging to one of the scientists, giving him the same powers. Speedball makes a number of attempts to catch the cat, hoping that study of Niels would give him better control of his powers. He would later learn that a villainous scientist, Clyde, was also after the cat, hoping to gain Speedball-like powers, and had allegedly created most of the supervillains in Springdale to this end. Speedball would later adopt the cat, who under the name of Hairball, would eventually have its own super adventures with the Pet Avengers.

While still an inexperienced crime-fighter, Speedball meets Spider-Man and Daredevil during a turf war between the Kingpin's and the High Evolutionary's henchmen.

The New Warriors
While shopping in New York City with his mother, Robbie Baldwin joins a battle between Terrax and a number of superheroes. The heroes become the founding members of the New Warriors, and Baldwin agrees to join the team. The commute from Connecticut to the team's headquarters in New York City is difficult and Baldwin is frequently late for Night Thrasher's formal meetings. With the New Warriors, he battles Psionex. He eventually reveals his double identity to the New Warriors, and when Speedball and the New Warriors battle the Force of Nature shortly afterwards, his mother also learns of his superhero identity. His father learns the truth some time later.

After Baldwin's mother discovers his secret identity, his parents' marriage ends and Baldwin moves permanently to New York City. Baldwin finds friendship with all of his fellow New Warriors, but his closest friendships are with Nova and Rage. After Baldwin is transported to the dimension his powers derive from, Darrion Grobe joins the New Warriors as Speedball, although the other members think he is Baldwin. Baldwin returns from the kinetic dimension and begins a brief relationship with Timeslip.

"Civil War"

At the beginning of the "Civil War" storyline, the New Warriors attempt to apprehend a group of supervillains in Stamford, Connecticut, for their television reality show. Nitro, one of the criminals, creates an explosive blast that kills 612 civilians, including 60 children, as well as the New Warriors with the exception of Robbie Baldwin. This event triggers the push for superhero registration at the heart of "Civil War".

After awakening from a coma, Baldwin is arrested by S.H.I.E.L.D. and placed in federal prison. Furthermore, his own mother disowns him. After he discovers his powers are still functional, Baldwin is taken to the new penitentiary called Negative Zone Prison Alpha. Reed Richards, the facility's creator, offers Baldwin the chance to testify before Congress. However, on the Capitol steps, Baldwin is shot by an assailant and taken away in an ambulance. Although bullet fragments remain inoperably lodged near his spine, Baldwin recovers from the wound. Richards determines that Baldwin's powers are evolving. Baldwin thwarts an escape from the prison and says that he will comply with the Superhuman Registration Act.

Overcome by guilt and driven insane by his treatment, Baldwin orders a new suit of armor that features 612 internal spikes, in honor of the victims of explosion in Stanford, to trigger his powers. 60 of the spikes are larger than the rest, to represent the children who perished in the blast. Baldwin then rechristens himself "Penance" and is assigned to the Thunderbolts.

The Penance revamp of the character is satirized in Deadpool/Great Lakes Avengers Summer Fun Spectacular, in which Squirrel Girl (who has a crush on Speedball and her first kiss) confronts Robbie after learning of his transformation into Penance. Robbie tells Squirrel Girl that he became Penance not out of guilt, but to become "deep" and to escape his comedy-character background. Furthermore, he reveals that he has created a similar costume for his pet cat Niels (who he has renamed "P-Cat, the Penitent Puss") while banging his head against the wall.

Thunderbolts

After the events of "Civil War", Robbie Baldwin joins Norman Osborn's new government-sponsored Thunderbolts team, which mostly comprises supervillains who are being forced to reform. On one of the new team's first missions, Osborn sends Bullseye and Penance to deal with a vigilante named Americop. Bullseye forces Baldwin to use his powers to cripple the vigilante. After finding out that Osborn gave the order to Bullseye to do this, Baldwin destroys an expensive, one-of-a-kind eavesdropping device of Osborn's, while reminding his boss that unlike many of the Thunderbolts under Osborn's leadership, he has no failsafe nanites in him that force his compliance.

During the team's mission to capture the Steel Spider, Penance suffers a mental breakdown and slams his head into a brick wall while remarking that he is "not good enough". Found by teammate Radioactive Man, Penance is eventually brought back to the Thunderbolts Mountain where he brutally assaults one of the prisoners after taunting Baldwin for his role in the Stamford tragedy. Osborn comes close to killing Baldwin, but the team's field leader Moonstone persuades that Baldwin could be manipulated and exploited as a Hulk-level enforcer for Osborn's schemes.

However, because of Baldwin's increasing signs of instability, Doc Samson arrives at Thunderbolts headquarters to provide additional psychiatric assistance. This foils Moonstone's plan to be Baldwin's therapist and exploit his fragile mental state to her own ends. Samson helps Penance focus his powers back to their original state, which he uses to defeat Moonstone in combat when (under the influence of a group of renegade telepaths) Moonstone tries to kill Samson.

The Thunderbolts fight Baldwin's former New Warriors teammate and best friend Nova after having recently returned to Earth. After the fight, Baldwin confronts Nova at his home and urges to register with the Initiative. Seeing Baldwin in this state prompts Nova to return to space.

Ultimately, Baldwin deserts the Thunderbolts, although they pursue him. Baldwin eludes them, and with Wolverine's help, he travels to Latveria to retrieve Nitro to stand trial for mass murder. During this adventure, Baldwin steals the ill-gotten fortune of Mendel Stromm, Norman's former employee and rival, after stealing information Osborn obtained on Stromm illegally via Osborn's position with the Thunderbolts. Baldwin confronts Doctor Doom as part of his quest. Doom eventually concedes the fight and relinquishes Nitro after realizing that defeating Baldwin would force him to tap into Latveria's secret nuclear power plants, potentially revealing their existence to the outside world. After secretly donating Stromm's fortune to charity for the rebuilding of Stamford, Baldwin arranges for a new Penance suit (with the same appearance but fewer spikes than the previous one) built after locking Nitro in the previous one. Nitro is imprisoned, but Robbie remains in the suit and returns to the Thunderbolts.

During the Secret Invasion, the Thunderbolts are sent to protect Washington from the Skrulls. Shortly after, Moonstone drugs Penance and, in the capacity as a psychiatrist, declares Penance needs to be permanently committed to the nearest corrupt maximum security hospital found.

Avengers Initiative
Penance, brainwashed and heavily drugged, is persuaded by Norman Osborn to join his new Initiative, at Camp H.A.M.M.E.R., and has psychotherapy sessions with Trauma, the camp therapist, having been ordered by Osborn to keep Penance in his mentally fragile state. Through Trauma's "pet therapy" method, Penance is unknowingly reunited with his cat Niels. When the Avengers Resistance, consisting of many of Penance's New Warriors teammates, come to Camp H.A.M.M.E.R. seeking to release a captured teammate, Taskmaster orders Penance to attack them. Their fight is interrupted by Nightmare having taken over the body of his son Trauma. Nightmare forces Penance to remember the Stamford incident, causing him to pass out in mental anguish. Tigra revives him, using her powers of empathy to help him see Trauma's predicament. With this knowledge, Penance is able to talk Trauma into freeing himself from his father's control. Penance then helps the Avengers Resistance escape Osborn's forces by rupturing a gas main. He refuses Vance's offer to join their team, not wanting his old friends to see how much he had changed.

Penance turns against Camp H.A.M.M.E.R. and helps the Avengers Resistance fight the Hood and those that are with Hood. During the battle, he finally reveals his identity to his other ex-New Warriors teammates.

"Heroic Age"
During the "Heroic Age," Robbie Baldwin returns to using the Speedball identity as part of the Avengers Academy's teaching staff.

Fear Itself
During the "Fear Itself" storyline, Speedball takes the Avengers Academy students on a field trip to the memorial for the people who died during the Stamford incident. They are attacked by a group called "the Cobalt Men", named after one of the villains involved in the Stamford incident. Not wanting them to ruin the memorial of the dead, Speedball quickly defeats them using his enhanced Penance powers. Speedball later admits he cuts himself to store up the energy he uses as Penance because this power is more useful in a fight. He acknowledges that he should not have kept this a secret, and Hank Pym offers to help him find a better way to activate those powers. He later confronts Kuurth, Nerkodd, and a hate group founded by Sin called Sisters of Sin. After this, he cheers up a little and regains his sense of humor. After returning to the Avengers Academy, Speedball announces to the students and teachers that he is quitting the faculty, but still offers to help them anytime.

While Speedball is conversing with Justice, a chance sighting of the successor to their former New Warriors teammate Nova leads them to conclude that the time is right to reform the New Warriors. They track down the new Nova and ultimately convince him to join the new team.

New Warriors: The New Team

Having taken to the road again, Speedball and Justice find themselves in the town of New Salem, Colorado, where they meet the Salem's Seven. They fight, but quickly patch things up after it is clear it was a misunderstanding. While Speedball plays video games with Brutacus, Justice has a little chat with Vertigo, Salem's Seven leader, about the town. When the conversation deviates to Justice's and Speedball's intention of reforming the New Warriors and the difficulties that that will probably bring due to the persisting bad reputation for their involvement in the Civil War events, the Evolutionaries arrive, intent on burning down the town. Justice, Speedball, and Salem's Seven drive them off. Their subsequent mission to stop the Evolutionaries leads to their recruiting of two heroes to the cause, Haechi and Sun Girl.

Looking for Nova but seeing he does not answer his phone, Speedball and the others head back to the Salem's Seven and through their help and that of New Salem's magical inhabitants, they locate the boy. As it turns out, Nova along with Hummingbird, Scarlet Spider and Faira Sar Namora of Atlantis had been kidnapped and were being held as prisoners in Mount Wundagore by the Evolutionaries and the High Evolutionary. Rushing, they arrive as the Evolutionaries are about to execute Nova, following his and the other prisoners' attempt to break out. Trying to reason with the High Evolutionary fails as this one gives a cryptic refusal and Nova reveals his plan of eliminating "mostly everyone". A chaotic fight ensues, with the prisoners, Sun Girl, Haechi and the New Warriors forming an impromptu team that manages to defeat the small army of Evolutionaries through their diverse and very different powers and abilities. Shortly after, when the High Evolutionary activates his machine to eliminate the super-powered population of Earth, Speedball and the others are brought down to their knees in excruciating pain and almost die, but they are all saved by Sun Girl who as a non-altered human is immune to the machine and destroys it. With the enemy fleeing but fearing its return, an invitation is made to everyone to join Speedball, Justice and Nova as New Warriors to face the High Evolutionary should he try to repeat his scheme - an invitation that is immediately refused, save for Hummingbird (who eagerly and joyfully accepts) and Sun Girl (who does so implicitly).

While Justice takes Scarlet Spider and Faira on the task of cleaning the mountain of the High Evolutionary's hostile contraptions and robots, Speedball takes Sun Girl, Hummingbird and Haechi to a nearby town - with the excuse that it had been attacked - to have dinner and to take an opportunity to know better its new teammates. When the topic of everyone's abilities is discussed and Speedball clarifies his capacity to "bounce", Hummingbird suddenly starts to inquire about his other powers, if he still cuts himself and the reasons why. Somehow, her strange psychic powers show her Speedball's mental image of himself as clad in the Penance suit instead of his normal appearance - indicating he still struggles internally with his guilt while keeping a carefree facade to everyone else. Speedball attempts to explain himself while telepathically warning Hummingbird in an ominous tone against reading his mind and to tell no one else about this. They decide to return to the base in Wundagore mountain where Justice and the others have encountered a pair of New Men that are willing to help their group. Hummingbird develops an "unfathomable" crush on Speedball.

The New Men - now renamed by themselves as Jack Waffles and Mr. Whiskers - assist the New Warriors to go to New York. However, they do so by using the base's advanced technology to teleport the entire Mount Wundagore, provoking a mass panic in the city but not causing any casualties (as the mountain is "half-phased", so most of it doesn't physically interact with the water or anything passing through it). Still, the Avengers take notice of the event and dispatch Iron Man and Thor. The former takes Speedball and Justice to Avenger's tower, where they and Captain America get into a discussion about the problems of reforming the New Warriors bring and the incident with the mountain. For a moment, as animosity rouses, Robbie starts to discreetly charge his Penance powers to use them against the Avengers. But he is touched by Justice's passionate defense of the New Warriors' team name, its members and their actions. They part with the Avengers in amicable terms.

Next day, when Haechi and Sun Girl are forcefully taken to Singapore by Inhuman supremacists led by Lash, Speedball and the rest of the New Warriors go to save them, battling through all the floors of a skyscraper building filled with innocent mind-controlled people. As they do so, Robbie questions Scarlet Spider if Hummingbird has said anything about him and jokingly suggests to don't believe anything she says because "she is really weird". When Scarlet Spider reprehends his timing and asks if Robbie can take anything seriously, Speedball discharges his Penance powers on the remaining mind-controlled adversaries and somberly proclaims "Yes. I can". They battle and defeat Lash's henchmen, who teleport away.

During a distraction trip the group takes to a bar in Prague, Hummingbird insists in dancing with Robbie. She reveals him she is enjoying herself as most as possibly as she is certain she will die soon as "Mictlan rises" (an oncoming event that portents in her dreams had been warning her about for months).

Time later, the New Warriors locate the High Evolutionary to stop him from continuing to pursue his plan. With great coordination, they expertly aboard his ship, defeat his last Evolutionaries and trap him. It is then that the Eternals appear to ensure the High Evolutionary fulfills his agenda and prevent the Celestials from judging and destroying Earth. As the situation turns for the worse, Robbie coldly assess each of his teammates and sees they are fighting a losing battle. Nevertheless, he throws his best against the Eternals and for a moment manages to inspire the others to do the same and gain the upper hand. Hummingbird then uses her telepathy to discover that the leader of the Eternals, Zuras, was lying, and the Celestials weren't coming. This was seemingly in vain as the New Warriors are defeated and used to power up the machine while Zuras manages to silence them or deflect any suspicion of his persona from his peers.

However, Justice, who had been dealt with separately from the rest of the team, returned to the fight and freed his teammates, damaging the High Evolutionary's machine in the process. Justice then convinced the rest of the Eternals and the High Evolutionary that Zuras had indeed been lying. The leader of the Eternals is forced to admit the Celestials weren't coming, albeit blaming the attempted genocide entirely on the High Evolutionary with the excuse "he had been tricked by him too". The Eternals leave, warned by the New Warriors not to come back.

Robbie is lastly seen happily walking away with the rest of his teammates from the crashed ship.

During the "Outlawed" storyline, Robbie appears as a member of C.R.A.D.L.E. when a law is passed that forbids superheroes who are below the age of 21.<ref>Outlawed #1. Marvel Comics.</ref>

Powers and abilities

As Speedball
As a result of the mutagenic effects of irradiation by an unknown form of energy, Robbie Baldwin possesses the superhuman ability to create a kinetic force field of unknown energy, manifested as iridescent bubbles, around himself which absorbs all kinetic energy directed against him and reflects it with even greater force against whatever object with which he is in contact. Hence, if he struck a wall, he would travel at a greater velocity in the opposite direction.

When Speedball uses his superhuman powers, his voices alters in an unknown fashion and solid force bubbles of residue kinetic field energy appear on his body and, when he bounces, in his wake. While bouncing, he is immune to any kind of harm caused by physical contact. Speedball's power activates automatically when any physical contact occurs above a low level that has not yet been precisely determined. When Speedball's kinetic field activates, his body increases in height and mass (drawn from an extradimensional source); he reverts to his normal size and mass on deactivating the field. Early in his career, the slightest touch, such as snapping his fingers, would turn on this field, but he eventually gained conscious control over it. The field repelled all energy that struck it, especially kinetic energy. As such, bullets, punches, and all other physical attacks bounced off him. A side effect of this, though, was that he, too, would bounce in the opposite direction. Baldwin often used this to his advantage, such as purposely running into a wall in order to gain momentum and thus hit an opponent with twice the force.

While with the Warriors, Baldwin gained far greater control over his powers via a combination of experience in battle and Night Thrasher's mentorship off the battlefield. Whereas previously Baldwin could barely bounce in the direction he wanted, he eventually became more proficient at controlling his leaps and using his powers in various ways, such as to deliver impressive blows, and even to project a stream of kinetic energy from his bubble field at a distance. He eventually learned to mentally "throw" the bubbles that surrounded his field to use as concussive force attacks. He was able to somewhat deflect Siena Blaze's electromagnetic attack that "no one short of the Hulk could have withstood", as well as resist the omnipath Gamesmaster's telepathy, one of the few people in the world to do so.

As Penance
After the events of Stamford, Baldwin believed his powers to be burned out. However, they still exist, but now only manifest when he experiences extreme stimulation, such as intense pain. While his powers are still kinetically based, they no longer appear to manifest as a "bubble field"; rather, his powers seem far more explosive in nature. In order to stimulate his powers, his Penance suit constantly rakes his flesh. Baldwin tolerates this to a masochistic degree, once stating that he would "wear [the suit] all the time if I could." By wearing the suit he has developed a natural tolerance to pain. His suit consists of 612 spikes facing inward, each to represent a person who lost their life in Stamford. 60 of the spikes are longer than the rest, one for each of the children.

Penance can achieve a variety of effects with his newfound powers. The most commonly used are explosive energy blasts from his hands, but he is capable of firing them from any part of his body via the conduits on his spikes. He can create storm-like fields of energy around him capable of harming those around him and smashing objects. He can focus the energy on parts of his body; often on his hands to form superpowerful punches. He can also engulf himself in an energy forcefield which gives him a degree of invulnerability and allows him to levitate off the ground.

Baldwin's powers are constantly evolving and his original Speedball powers are shown to be returning to him. Robbie no longer needs the Penance suit to activate his powers but chose to wear it for a time to help remedy the guilt he feels, as well as for the benefits to his powers.

 Reception 

 Accolades 

 In 2021, Screen Rant included Robbie Baldwin in their "10 Marvel Superheroes From The ‘80s Who Should Join The MCU" list.
 In 2022, CBR.com ranked Robbie Baldwin 6th in their "10 Kindest Marvel Villains" list 7th in their "10 Fastest Marvel Sidekicks" list.

Other versions
Exiles
In an Exiles reality where the Hulk, after being sent into space, kills Annihilus and leads the Annihilation Wave to Earth; Robbie (as Speedball) is one of the remaining superhumans, alongside Quentin Quire and his Exiles.

House of M
In House of M, Robbie appears as a member of the Wolfpack. He appears in his Speedball costume.

Marvel Apes
In the Marvel Apes universe, a chimp version of Speedball appears alongside an ape-hero called Ape X. The two seem to act as partners and are both Avengers. He seems loyal to them, but at the end of the second issue he is seen with a group of what would usually be considered "his enemies". He asks Marty Gibbon about the human version of Speedball, but Marty does not have the heart to tell him about the Stamford incident. He's later revealed to be part of a group trying to reveal that the Captain America leading the Ape-vengers is Baron Blood in disguise. After freeing the real Cap from the ice, the group goes out to fight Blood. Lost members of the Marvel 616 universe, the main Marvel universe, take a wounded Baldwin back home with them and get him medical treatment. He elects to stay, explaining that his entire ape-centric earth will reject him for helping humans. In the epilogue he tries applying for the Avengers.

MC2
An older version of Speedball exists in the MC2 universe, and appears sporadically in the Spider-Girl series and related miniseries. At some point he became a member of the Avengers, but has since left the team.Spider-Girl #15. Marvel Comics.

Marvel Team-Up: League of Losers
Speedball features in an arc of Robert Kirkman's Marvel Team-Up (vol. 3), featuring a group of C-list heroes dubbed "The League of Losers". A group of heroes including Gravity, Darkhawk, Dagger, Araña, X-23, Sleepwalker, and Terror (although Araña dies along the way) go to the future to prevent the villain Chronok from stealing Reed Richards' time machine, Chronok having come to the present and already having killed all of Marvel's major heroes.

It is revealed Chronok is from the same time period as Kirkman's Mutant 2099; the group stays with him and his mentor Reed Richards to wait for Chronok. The team defeats Chronok, but at the end of the story, Richards reveals they cannot go back to their present, due to time-travel and alternate timelines. The group decides to stay in the future, satisfied with the impact they made, however unnoticed. Mutant 2099 suggests reforming the Avengers or the "Fantastic Nine".

Due to the Marvel Universe's method for resolving time travel paradoxes, the League of Losers' actions created an alternate universe. This is the alternate future visited by Squirrel Girl, a superhero with a crush on him, in Deadpool/GLI Summer Fun (2007). She tries to convince him to return, suggesting that no-one would mix him up with the Penance from her time, but, before he can decide, the 2099 version of Mr Immortal, Squirrel Girl's GLI leader, tells her she needs to return to the present.

Marvel Zombies
A zombified Speedball participates in a multi-zombie attack on the castle of Doctor Doom; where a few human survivors were hiding. Later, he is seen in the ruins of New York. He is one of the many casualties in the conflict waged against the Silver Surfer, ending up torn apart by the Power Cosmic.

Ultimate Marvel
An Ultimate Marvel version of Speedball is mentioned. An overweight man in a Speedball costume is depicted in police custody.

In other media
Television
 Robbie Baldwin as Speedball makes cameo appearances in the Fantastic Four. He appears in the episodes "To Battle the Living Planet" and "Doomsday."
 Robbie Baldwin as Speedball makes cameo appearances in the Ultimate Spider-Man. He appears in the episodes "Agent Venom" and "The Next Iron Spider" as one of several young superheroes inspired by Spider-Man and observed by S.H.I.E.L.D.
 Robbie Baldwin as Speedball was set to appear in New Warriors, portrayed by Calum Worthy, before it was shelved.

Video games
 Robbie Baldwin as Speedball makes a cameo appearance in The Amazing Spider-Man: Lethal Foes.
 Robbie Baldwin as Penance appears as a playable character in Marvel: Ultimate Alliance 2, voiced by Benjamin Diskin. Additionally, in the Wii version, he goes on to form the Thunderbolts with Songbird, Venom and the Green Goblin.
 Robbie Baldwin as Speedball appears in Marvel Heroes''.

Collected editions

Notes

References

External links
 Robbie Baldwin at Marvel.com
 Review of Relentless #1, September 21, 2007
 

Avengers (comics) characters
Characters created by Steve Ditko
Characters created by Tom DeFalco
Comics characters introduced in 1988
Fictional characters from Connecticut
Marvel Comics mutates
Teenage superheroes